Ahmed Mostafa (8 March 1940 – 17 February 2022) was an Egyptian footballer who played as a defender and midfielder for Zamalek, he also played for the Egypt national team.

International career
Mostafa represented Egypt (as United Arab Republic) in the 1962 African Cup of Nations and the 1964 Summer Olympics.

Personal life and death
Mostafa died on 17 February 2022, at the age of 81.

Honours
Zamalek
 Egyptian Premier League: 1959–60, 1963–64, 1964–65
 Egypt Cup: 1958–59, 1959–60, 1961–62

References

External links
 

1940 births
2022 deaths
Footballers from Cairo
Egyptian footballers
Association football defenders
Association football midfielders
Egypt international footballers
Olympic footballers of Egypt
1962 African Cup of Nations players
Footballers at the 1964 Summer Olympics
Egyptian Premier League players
Zamalek SC players